The Light of the World is a 1750 oil-on-canvas painting by François Boucher, now in the Musée des beaux-arts de Lyon.

It was Madame de Pompadour's first commission from the artist and his first large-format religious work – he only produced a total of five of the latter. It was initially called The Adoration of the Shepherds. It was exhibited at the Paris Salon in 1750 and won him the commission to paint a room at the Louvre as well as the post of first painter to the king. The painting was placed on the altar in the closet of one of the ante-chambers of the Château de Bellevue. Étienne Fessard made an engraving of the painting in 1761, giving it its present title. It left the Château between 1762 and 1764, passing through several collections before being assigned to the Louvre by the Office des biens et Intérêts privé in 1951. It was assigned by them to the Musée des beaux-arts de Lyon in 1955.

External links
http://www.mba-lyon.fr/mba/sections/fr/collections-musee/peintures/oeuvres-peintures/xviiie_siecle/boucher_lumiere-mond
http://www.passee-des-arts.com/article-les-surprises-du-gout-aspects-de-la-peinture-fran-aise-au-temps-de-madame-de-pompadour-46435921.html

1750 paintings
Paintings by François Boucher
Nativity of Jesus in art